is a Japanese politician who serves as a member of the House of Councillors in the Diet (national legislature), representing the Japan Communist Party. A native of Kagawa Prefecture and graduate of Tottori University, he was elected to the House of Councillors for the first time in 1995 after running unsuccessfully in 1992. He lost the seat in the 2001 re-election and then ran unsuccessfully for the House of Representatives in 2003 and 2005. In 2007, he was elected to the House of Councillors for the second time. He is known for his left-wing radicalism.

References

External links 
 Official website in Japanese.
 House of Councillors website

Members of the House of Councillors (Japan)
Japanese Communist Party politicians
1960 births
Living people